Maireana decalvans, the black cotton-bush, is a species of flowering plant in the family Amaranthaceae, native to central and eastern Australia, and introduced to the Cape Provinces of South Africa. It is occasionally a pioneer species on disturbed ground, but typically grows in seasonally waterlogged soils.

References

decalvans
Endemic flora of Australia
Flora of South Australia
Flora of Queensland
Flora of New South Wales
Flora of Victoria (Australia)
Plants described in 1975